Meoneura is a genus of carnid flies (Diptera).

Species
Species include:

References

Carnidae
Carnoidea genera
Taxa named by Camillo Rondani